Grande Rivière des Vieux-Habitants is a river in the Guadeloupe National Park, Basse-Terre, Guadeloupe. Its course starts at the Petit Sans Toucher before it passes through the town of Vieux-Habitants where it separates into two branches before emptying into the Caribbean Sea. Habitation La Grivelière is located in the river valley.

References

External links

Rivers of Guadeloupe
Rivers of France